Rungkut is a subdistrict in the East Surabaya.

Surabaya